For King & Country, stylised as for KING & COUNTRY and formerly known as Joel & Luke as well as Austoville, is a Christian pop duo composed of Australian brothers Joel (born 5 June 1984) and Luke Smallbone (born 22 October 1986). The brothers were born in Australia and immigrated to the United States as children, settling in the Nashville area.

After releasing a short EP as Joel and Luke, in 2012 they released their debut record Crave. The band was declared by Billboard as one of the "New Artists to Watch" for 2012. American Songwriter described them as "Australia's answer to Coldplay". In 2014, they released their second studio album, Run Wild. Live Free. Love Strong., which won a Grammy award.

In 2018, they released Burn the Ships, which achieved gold status. The album featured four singles, including "God Only Knows", which achieved platinum status, and "Joy" and "Burn the Ships", which reached gold status. In 2020, they released a full-length Christmas album, A Drummer Boy Christmas. In 2022, they released their fifth studio album, What Are We Waiting For?

The band has collaborated with many artists on their work, including Dolly Parton, Timbaland, Tori Kelly, Lecrae, Needtobreathe, and others.

History

Early music career 
The brothers supplied background vocals and other supporting roles for their sister and family members, Rebecca St. James, and various bands in concerts across America. Shortly after Luke graduated from high school, the brothers decided to explore the possibility of forming a band, and in 2007, they began performing as their band. They began their career as "Joel & Luke", which they later changed to "Austoville", before settling on their current name.

In 2008, "Joel & Luke" released a six-song EP titled A Tale of Two Towns. Three of those songs ("Missing", "Sane", and "Love's to Blame") appeared on Crave with slightly different melodies and lyrics. The other three songs were "Broken Lullabies", "Believe Me Now", and "Something's Gotta Give". Love's to Blame was co-written by St. James.

Rename to "for King & Country" and Crave 
In 2009, they signed on with Warner Music Group with Ben Glover as their producer. They changed their name to "For King & Country", after a British battle cry. Luke said,

"We wanted a band name that carried more meaning. We were in the studio recording our debut record that Joel had the idea of All The King's Men, like the Humpty Dumpty nursery rhyme. Our producer overheard our conversation and swung around in his chair and said, 'What about For King & Country?' And we all felt a sense of providence at that moment. "For King and Country" was the battle cry of English soldiers willing to lay down their lives for their king and their country. And now it has become our mission, to lay down our lives for our King and our country."

In 2011, they released For King & Country: The EP. Their song "Busted Heart (Hold On to Me)" was released as a single and peaked at No. 3 on Billboards Christian Songs chart. They described "Busted Heart" as "really a universal cry of humanity for something greater than ourselves...We think we've got it all sorted out, and life will deal you those blows." "Busted Heart" was the fastest-rising single of 2011 in their genre, climbing the Top 10 for weeks.

Their debut album Crave was released on 28 February 2012. The album hit No. 2 on the iTunes Top Christian & Gospel albums on its day of release and No. 42 on the overall chart. It peaked at No. 4 on Billboards Christian Albums chart, and remained on the chart for 41 weeks. It also reached No. 128 on the Billboard 200 chart. The album has received positive reviews from critics. Shortly after Craves release, they released "The Proof of Your Love" as a single, remixed and titled "The Proof of Your Love: The Monologue Mix". The single reached No. 8 on Billboards Hot Christian Songs chart and spent 29 weeks on the chart. The band toured on the 2012 Winter Jam Tour Spectacular. In May 2012, they appeared on the Huckabee show on Fox News Channel.

Their debut hit song, "Busted Heart (Hold On to Me)" was featured on 28 October 2012 episode of VH1's Rehab with Dr. Drew. Among other television placements, their songs "People Change" and "Love's To Blame" have been featured on The CW's Vampire Diaries, and "Light It Up" and "Sane" have been featured on the Lifetime show Drop Dead Diva. In July 2012, they announced The Proof of Your Love Tour with Jason Castro and Dara Maclean to visit 30 cities from September through November 2012. In October 2012, they released an original Christmas song: "Baby Boy"; it reached No. 20 on the Hot Christian Songs chart. During the summer of 2013, the band was forced to take time off when the  Luke dropped to  due to an attack of ulcerative colitis. In June 2013, Joel Smallbone appeared in a non-singing role as King Xerxes in the film, The Book of Esther from Pure Flix Entertainment.

In August 2013, the band released Hope Is What We Crave: Live, a live album and DVD, both recorded at The Factory in Nashville on the last night of the band's first headlining tour. They also released "Hope Is What We Crave" as a single. It is a reworked version of "Crave" from their album. They toured with Casting Crowns starting in February 2014.

Rise in popularity 
For King and Country released a new album Run Wild. Live Free. Love Strong. on 16 September 2014. The album spent 17 weeks on the Billboard 200, peaking at No. 13, and reached No. 12 on the Digital Albums Chart. The band performed their songs "Run Wild" and "Fix My Eyes" on Jimmy Kimmel Live! on 25 March 2015. They were part of the Winter Jam Tour 2015 in the central and eastern parts of the United States and part of Winter Jam 2016. The duo released a deluxe anniversary edition of the album on 23 October 2015, including three new songs: "Priceless", "Ceasefire" and "Wholehearted", as well as a reworked version of "It's Not Over Yet", called "The Encore".

In 2016, Curb Records acquired Warner Music Group's stake in the band's record label, Word Entertainment, thus becoming King & Country's record label.

After releasing their second album, the brothers focused much of their time on the feature film Priceless, which stars Joel in a story about human trafficking. They wrote several songs for the film, part of the reason it took four years to release their next studio album. They also wrote a song, accompanied by a music video, entitled "Ceasefire" for the 2016 adaptation of Ben-Hur; the song was used in the second official trailer for the film and released as part of the official soundtrack.

On 27 October 2017, they released Christmas: Live from Phoenix, and shortly thereafter embarked on "A Glorious Christmas" tour with Casting Crowns.

Continued success 
The band announced that they had begun writing their third studio album, in January 2017. The album's lead single, "Joy", was released on 18 May 2018. It reached No. 35 on Billboard'''s Adult Top 40 chart and No. 2 on the Hot Christian Songs chart. Burn the Ships was released on 5 October 2018. The brothers described it as the "most mature record that we've made just in understanding who we are as a duo, who we are as men and maybe understanding life because we are a bit older than we were last time around." Two of the songs were written about the weighty topics of addiction and suicide, and two were written to and about their wives (who sing in the final track, "Pioneers", and appear in the accompanying music video). The album contains ten songs and they released five music videos to accompany them. "Joy" was nominated for the 2019 Grammy Award for Best Contemporary Christian Music Performance/Song.

On 11 January 2019, "God Only Knows" was released to radio becoming the second single from the album. The song had crossover success, reaching the Billboard Hot 100 and peaking at #17 on the Adult Contemporary chart. The band collaborated with Dolly Parton, who was featured on a new version of "God Only Knows". They also released new versions of the song featuring collaborations with Timbaland and Echosmith.

The Burn the Ships album won a Grammy in 2019, as did the single "God Only Knows".

In 2020, after cancelling its scheduled tour due to the coronavirus pandemic, the band performed drive-in style outdoor concerts where attendees listened and watched from their cars. The band announced they had reached over one billion digital streams of their songs.

In October 2020, the band released A Drummer Boy Christmas, a full-length Christmas album featuring collaborations with Needtobreathe and Gabby Barrett.

In 2021, Burn the Ships achieved RIAA gold certification. The band also released a deluxe edition featuring remixes and collaborations with Parton, Timbaland, Echosmith, Tori Kelly, Lecrae, and Kirk Franklin. Also in 2021, the band released "Relate", a single from their forthcoming studio album What Are We Waiting For?, which was released in March 2022. "Relate" became the band's seventh straight number one hit on the Christian Airplay chart. On 24 September 2021, the band released a single titled "For God Is with Us", which would eventually also be on What Are We Waiting For?. The song peaked at 1 on the Christian Airplay chart, which became their eighth straight single to reach the mark. The band then embarked on a fall tour titled Relate | The Fall Tour | promoting these two singles.

On 7 January 2022, the band released a promotional single titled "Unsung Hero", which is about their mom. The song peaked at 42 on the Hot Christian Songs chart. On the same date, pre-ordering for the new album started. On 18 February 2022, the band released their second promotional single from the album, titled "Love Me Like I Am". The song originally charted at 38 on the Hot Christian Songs chart.

On 3 March 2022, they became the first Christian act to perform at RodeoHouston.

The band's fifth studio album, What Are We Waiting For?, was released 11 March 2022. The album debuted at #1 on the Billboard Top Christian albums chart and #7 on the Billboard 200. One of the songs, "Broken Halos" peaked at 37 on the Hot Christian Songs chart, as a music video was released along with the song.

On 7 October 2022, the band re-released their song "Love Me Like I Am" as a single featuring American singer and actress, Jordin Sparks who was the winner of season 6 of American Idol. In addition to featuring Sparks, the song included reworked instruments. The song peaked at No. 10 on the Hot Christian Songs chart.

Music and influencesSUSIE Magazine stated, "It takes only one listen to the brothers' rich, upbeat, alternative sounds and thoughtful lyrics to understand their sudden popularity."

In a 2012 interview, they described their philosophy:
"The power of music can impact our mood, emotions, our day. But when you merge the strength of music with the heart, hope and passion of the Gospel... it has the ultimate power not only to change someone's day, but to impact them for eternity. This is why we write music and sing songs – we hope that people will be moved, encouraged and stirred to live a life for Someone greater than themselves."

They cite U2, Mutemath, OneRepublic, the Beatles, Goo Goo Dolls, and Switchfoot, as well as film scores, such as those from Braveheart and Gladiator, as their musical influences.
Also in a recent interview with Jesus Music, member Joel Smallbone discussed the 80's hair metal band Stryper and their early influence on the band. The interview can be found on Stryper's Facebook page.

Personal lives
Joel David Smallbone was born on 5 June 1984 and Luke James Smallbone was born on 22 October 1986. Both were born in Sydney, to David and Helen Smallbone, and moved to Nashville, Tennessee in 1991, after their father's job relocation. Their father was a music promoter, and Joel recalls, "going to these rock concerts, sitting on my father's shoulders, plugging my ears...Honestly, in a lot of ways, I feel like music chose me and as I grew older, I made a clear decision to fully lean into it." The Smallbones are the younger brothers of Christian recording artist and speaker Rebecca St. James, and the brothers-in-law of Jacob Fink, former bassist for the band Foster the People. They were raised with another sister, Libby, and three other brothers, Ben, Dan, and Josh.

On 26 June 2010, Luke married Courtney Helm. Their first child was born on 19 December 2012. They also have a son.  In late 2016, Luke announced via social media that he and his wife are expecting their third child.  From 2013 to 2015, Luke battled a life-threatening case of ulcerative colitis, pushing him near death and causing him to miss 40 of the band's live shows. He went into remission in 2015. He and his wife also nearly lost their two-month-old son to sudden infant death syndrome in 2018; he has since made a full recovery after skull reconstruction surgery.

On 7 July 2013, Joel married Moriah Peters, who is also a recording artist, in California. They now reside in Franklin, Tennessee.

Both brothers are dual citizens of Australia and the United States.

Discography

 Crave (2012)
 Run Wild. Live Free. Love Strong. (2014)
 Burn the Ships (2018)
 A Drummer Boy Christmas (2020)
 What Are We Waiting For? (2022)

 Other media 
Film
In 2014, Joel Smallbone starred in the movie "Like A Country Song" which also starred multi-platinum selling recording artist Billy Ray Cyrus and Two And A Half Men's Jennifer Taylor.
Joel Smallbone was the lead actor in a 2016 drama about human trafficking entitled Priceless, which was released in theatres in October 2016. Luke was one of the producers (together with their father) and their brother Ben directed the movie. Some of the music for the film was written by For King & Country.

In 2019, it was announced that the brothers were working on a musical under the title The Drummer Boy with the Erwin brothers, though no new information has since been released.

On November 30, 2022, the brothers announced via social media that they had made a movie with their brother Ben, called Unsung Hero, which is about their mother, but they didn't announce a release date.

Novel
A novel, Priceless: She's Worth Fighting For, based on the film Priceless, was released on 6 September 2016.

Awards and nominations
In December 2012, iTunes selected Crave as their Breakthrough Christian & Gospel Album of 2012 while at the inaugural K-LOVE Fan Awards held 1 June 2013, they collected the "Breakthrough Artist of the Year". In 2015, they won two Grammy Awards at the 57th Grammy Awards, one for Best Contemporary Christian Music Album and one for Best Contemporary Christian Music Performance/Song.

Billboard Music Awards

|-
! scope="row" rowspan="3" | 2019 
| For King & Country 
| Top Christian Artist 
| 
|-
| Burn the Ships 
| Top Christian Album 
| 
|-
| "Joy" 
| Top Christian Song 
| 
|-
! scope="row" rowspan="2" | 2020 
| For King & Country 
| Top Christian Artist 
| 
|-
| "God Only Knows"
| Top Christian Song 
| 
|-
! scope="row" rowspan="2" | 2021 
| For King & Country 
| Top Christian Artist 
| 
|-
| "Together" 
| Top Christian Song 
| 
|-
| 2022 
| For King & Country 
| Top Christian Artist 
| 
|}

Grammy Awards

|-
! scope="row" rowspan="2" | 2015
| Run Wild. Live Free. Love Strong.| Best Contemporary Christian Music Album
| 
|-
| "Messengers" 
| Best Contemporary Christian Music Performance/Song 
| 
|-
! scope="row" | 2017
| "Priceless"
| Best Contemporary Christian Music Performance/Song
| 
|-
! scope="row" | 2019
| "Joy"
| Best Contemporary Christian Music Performance/Song
| 
|-
! scope="row" rowspan="2" | 2020
| "God Only Knows" 
| Best Contemporary Christian Music Performance/Song
| 
|-
| Burn the Ships| Best Contemporary Christian Music Album 
| 
|-
! scope="row" | 2023
| "For God Is with Us" 
| Best Contemporary Christian Music Performance/Song
| 
|}

GMA Dove Awards

|-
! scope="row" rowspan="6" | 2013
| rowspan="2" | "The Proof of Your Love"
| Song of the Year
| 
|-
| Contemporary Christian Performance
| 
|-
| Crave| Pop/Contemporary Album of the Year
| 
|-
| "Caught Dreaming" 
| Rap/Hip-Hop Song of the Year 
| 
|-
| For King & Country
| New Artist of the Year
| 
|-
| "The Proof of Your Love"
| Short Form Music Video of the Year
| 
|-
! scope="row" rowspan="2" | 2015
| For King & Country
| Contemporary Christian Artist of the Year
| 
|-
| Run Wild. Live Free. Love Strong.| Pop/Contemporary Album of the Year
| 
|-
! scope="row" | 2016
| For King & Country
| Contemporary Christian Artist of the Year
| 
|-
! scope="row" rowspan="5" | 2019
| "Joy"
| Song of the Year 
| 
|-
| For King & Country 
| Songwriter of the Year (Artist)
| 
|-
| For King & Country
| Artist of the Year 
| 
|-
| "God Only Knows"
| Pop/Contemporary Recorded Song of the Year
| 
|-
| Burn the Ships| Pop/Contemporary Album of the Year 
| 
|-
! scope="row" rowspan="6" | 2020
| "Burn the Ships"
| Song of the Year
| 
|-
| rowspan="2" | For King & Country
| Contemporary Christian Artist of the Year
| 
|-
| Artist of the Year
| 
|-
| "Burn the Ships"
| Pop/Contemporary Recorded Song of the Year
| 
|-
| "Solo Dios Sabe (God Only Knows)" )
| Spanish Language Recorded Song of the Year 
| 
|-
| "God Only Knows"
| Short Form Video of the Year
| 
|-
! scope="row" rowspan="7" | 2021
| "Together"
| Song of the Year
| 
|-
| rowspan="2" | For King & Country
| Contemporary Christian Artist of the Year
| 
|-
| Artist of the Year
| 
|-
| "Together" 
| Pop/Contemporary Recorded Song of the Year
| 
|-
| rowspan="2" | A Drummer Boy Christmas| Christmas / Special Event Album of the Year
| 
|-
| Recorded Music Packaging of the Year
| 
|- 
| Burn The Ships Concert Film| Long Form Video of the Year
| 
|-
! scope="row" rowspan="6" | 2022
| For King & Country
| Artist of the Year
|  
|-
| rowspan="2" | "Relate"
| Pop/Contemporary Recorded Song of the Year
| 
|-
| Short Form Music Video of the Year (Concept)
| 
|-
| What Are We Waiting For?| Pop/Contemporary Album of the Year
|  
|-
| "For God Is with Us"
| Short Form Music Video of the Year (Performance)
| 
|-
| What Are We Waiting For?  The Worldwide Special''
| Long Form Video of the Year
|  
|-
|}

Tours

Headlining 

 The Proof of Your Love Tour (2012) (featuring Dara Maclean and Jason Castro)
 You Matter | The Tour (2014-2015)
 A For King & Country Christmas (2016) (featuring Lauren Daigle)
 Burn the Ships (2018-2020)
 Little Drummer Boy | The Christmas Tour (2018) (featuring Cory Asbury and Zach Williams)
 Together Again (2020)
 A Drummer Boy Christmas (2020-2022)
 Relate: The Fall Tour (2021)
 What Are We Waiting For? The Tour (2022-2023) (featuring Dante Bowe)

Co-headlining 

 Winter Jam 2016 (with Matthew West) (featuring Crowder, Lauren Daigle, Red, KB, Tedashii, Trip Lee, Sidewalk Prophets, and NewSong)
 Priceless: The Tour (2016) (with KB) (featuring Jordan Feliz)
 A Glorious Christmas (2017) (with Casting Crowns)
 The Roadshow 2018 (with Matthew West, Natalie Grant, Bethel Music, Zach Williams, and Social Club Misfits)
 joy.UNLEASHED (2018) (with Skillet)

Supporting 

 Winter Jam Fall Tour 2011 (Newsboys, Kutless, Matthew West, Red, Fireflight, KJ-52, NewSong, Dara Maclean, and Patrick Ryan Clark)
 Winter Jam 2012 (Skillet, Sanctus Real, Peter Furler, Kari Jobe, NewSong, Building 429, and Group 1 Crew)
 RESTART Tour (2013) (Newsboys) (supporting with Rapture Ruckus, Moriah Peters, and CAMPBELL)
 K-Love Christmas Tour (2013) (Big Daddy Weave) (supporting with Meredith Andrews)
 The Thrive Tour (2014) (Casting Crowns)
 Winter Jam 2015 (Skillet, Jeremy Camp, Francesca Battistelli, Building 429, NewSong, and Family Force 5)

Other Live Efforts 
In addition to performing on a number of concert tours over the years, the band usually spends the summers performing at summer festivals across the United States and Canada. The band is a regular performer at Lifest in Oshkosh, Wisconsin, Alive Festival in Mineral City, Ohio, and SoulFest in Gilford, New Hampshire. The band has also performed at a number of non-christian music festivals such as the Florida Strawberry Festival, Kentucky State Fair, L.A. County Fair, and Summerfest.

References

External links
 

Australian alternative rock groups
Australian expatriates in the United States
Australian Christian rock groups
Fervent Records artists
Christian musical groups
Performers of contemporary Christian music
Curb Records artists
Musical groups established in 2007
Sibling duos